Rye High School may refer to:

Rye High School (Colorado), located in Rye, Colorado
Rye High School (New York), located in Rye, New York